The Paragould War Memorial is a scaled-down replica of the Statue of Liberty, located in Courthouse Park near the Greene County Courthouse at the heart of Paragould, Arkansas. The statue is a bronze cast created by John Paulding, and was cast at the American Art Bronze Foundry in Chicago, Illinois in 1920. It was erected to honor the city's soldiers who participated in World War I, and is the only sculptural memorial into Arkansas from that war that is not a doughboy statue.

The memorial was listed on the National Register of Historic Places in 1997.

See also
National Register of Historic Places listings in Greene County, Arkansas
Replicas of the Statue of Liberty

References

Monuments and memorials on the National Register of Historic Places in Arkansas
Buildings and structures completed in 1924
Buildings and structures in Paragould, Arkansas
Replicas
World War I memorials in the United States
National Register of Historic Places in Greene County, Arkansas